Sergi López may refer to:
Sergi López (actor) (born 1965), Spanish actor
Sergi López Segú (1967–2006), Spanish footballer

See also
Sergio López (disambiguation)
Sergi, the given name
López, the surname